The Château d' Homps is a ruined castle in the commune of Homps in the Gers département of France. The 13th-century fortification on a rocky outcrop was abandoned for a more comfortable house built in the 16th century. It was sold as a national asset at the time of the French Revolution and used as a quarry. Only a tower converted into a pigeon loft has been saved intact. The courtyard and parts of the enceinte are still visible. The privately owned castle has been listed since 1999 as a monument historique by the French Ministry of Culture.

See also
List of castles in France

References

External links
 

Monuments historiques of Gers
Buildings and structures in Gers
Ruined castles in Occitania (administrative region)